Arthur Meeker Jr. (November 3, 1902 – October 22, 1971) was an American novelist and journalist.

Early life
Meeker was born in Chicago to a prominent, wealthy family on November 3, 1902. He had three sisters. His father retired from his position as an executive with Armour & Co. in 1928 and died in 1946. His mother Grace Murray Meeker died in 1948. The family lived on Prairie Avenue and also owned Arcady Farm near Lake Forest. Meeker studied play-writing at Harvard and Princeton, but left without graduating.

Career
He wrote society and travel articles for the Chicago American, the Chicago Daily News, and the Chicago Herald. He achieved critical acclaim as the author of several historical novels, notably The Ivory Mischief, which was a Book of the Month Club selection. Time said "It seems another of those long (840-page), thickly upholstered Jumbos of period fiction.... But unlike most books of the type, its re-creation is solid, convincing and intimate, its characterizations are shrewd, its style adult, and even the upholstery is interesting." He wrote two novels set in contemporary Chicago, The Far Away Music and Prairie Avenue, which the New York Times called a "light and colorful entertainment."

At the start of his career as a novelist, one report of literary events said:

Meeker spent part of each year in Europe, became fluent in French, and purchased a chalet in Switzerland on the Bürgenstock above Lucerne. He often accompanied the Chicago socialite-journalist Fanny Butcher and her husband on tours of Europe. He gave up his Chicago home in 1951 for an apartment at 4 Gramercy Park in New York City. Meeker served as president of the Society of Midland Authors and with Butcher co-founded the Chicago chapter of P.E.N. about 1931, serving initially as its secretary.

Personal life

Letters he wrote to his family from Europe in the 1930s suggest he was homosexual. He had a thirty-year relationship with Robert Molnar, with whom he lived from at least 1940 until Meeker's death in their New York City home on October 22, 1971. Meeker named Molnar his heir.

Works
Novels:
American Beauty (Covici-Friede, 1929)
Strange Capers (Covici-Friede, 1931)
Vestal Virgin (NY: G.P. Putnam's Sons 1934)
Sacrifice to the Graces (NY: D. Appleton-Century, 1937)
The Ivory Mischief (Boston: Houghton Mifflin, 1942) 
The Far Away Music (Boston: Houghton Mifflin, 1945)
Prairie Avenue (NY: Knopf, 1949) 
The Silver Plume (NY: Knopf, 1952)

Memoir:
Chicago, With Love: A Polite and Personal History (NY: Knopf, 1955)

Notes

External links
 Arthur Meeker, Jr. Papers at the Newberry Library

1902 births
1971 deaths
American historical novelists
Writers from Chicago
Writers from Manhattan
Harvard University alumni
Princeton University alumni
20th-century American novelists
American male novelists
20th-century American male writers
Novelists from New York (state)
Novelists from Illinois
People from Gramercy Park
Burials at Graceland Cemetery (Chicago)